The CONCACAF Futsal Club Championship  is the North American futsal club competition hosted by CONCACAF.

History and format
The inaugural CONCACAF Futsal Club Championship was played from August 20 to 24, 2014, at the Domo Polideportivo de la CDAG at Guatemala City, Guatemala. A total of six teams participated: Glucosoral (Guatemala), Habana (Cuba), U.E.S. (El Salvador), Borussia (Costa Rica), Sidekicks (Mexico), and Futsal Club Toronto (Canada). The six teams were divided into two groups of three, playing a round-robin format during the opening round of the tournament. The top two teams of each group advanced to the semifinals, followed by the third place match and the final a day later.

Summaries

References

External links
Futsal, CONCACAF.com

 
International club futsal competitions
Futsal
Futsal competitions in North America
2014 establishments in Guatemala